Denticles, also called serrations, are small bumps on a tooth that serve to give the tooth a serrated edge. In paleontology, denticle characteristics such as size and density (denticles per unit distance) are used to describe and classify fossilized teeth, especially those of dinosaurs. Denticles are also present on the teeth of varanoid lizards, sharks, and mammals. The term is also used to describe the analogous radular teeth of mollusks.

References

Parts of tooth